The Embassy of the Republic of Serbia in Peru was the diplomatic mission of the Republic of Serbia to the Republic of Peru. From its establishment in 1968 until 2006, the embassy represented the Socialist Federal Republic of Yugoslavia and its successor, the Federal Republic of Yugoslavia. Its closure was announced in May 2009.

History

Relations between Peru and the then Kingdom of Yugoslavia date back to the 1920s, as the latter had established an honorary consulate in Lima, and the former had consulates in Belgrade and Zagreb by 1929. The former also had a Croat minority present in the city's capital, Callao and Cerro de Pasco, represented by the Yugoslav Society in central Lima. During World War II, Peru established economic and consular relations with the Yugoslav government-in-exile in October 1942. The consulate and embassy accredited to Peru were then located in Santiago de Chile.

After Juan Velasco Alvarado's coup d'état against Fernando Belaúnde and the establishment of his so-called revolutionary government, Peru reestablished relations with the countries of the second world, including the Socialist Federal Republic of Yugoslavia in 1967. Thus, the Yugoslav consulate was opened in Lima, replacing the honorary consulate. Relations were then upgraded to embassy level on December of the following year, and the Yugoslav ambassador presented his credentials on January 9, 1971.

During the internal conflict in Peru, due to the region's support of the Peruvian government and lack of support for the terror group, embassies of the Eastern Bloc were attacked by the Shining Path on several occasions, such as in 1986, when the Soviet embassy was attacked, or in 1987, when the North Korean embassy was bombed. The Yugoslav embassy was not spared from the conflict either, as it was also the target of an unsuccessful bombing on September 4, 1981.

After the breakup of Yugoslavia, Peru continued relations with the Federal Republic of Yugoslavia (Serbia and Montenegro) and its other successor states. The Peruvian embassy in Belgrade closed in 2006, instead accrediting its ambassadors in the former country's neighbouring regions to the successor states of Yugoslavia, including now independent Serbia. On the other hand, the Serbian embassy's closure was announced and finalized in 2009, with the Serbian mission in Buenos Aires becoming accredited to Peru instead.

See also
Embassy of China, Lima
Embassy of Russia, Lima

References

Bibliography

Peru
Serbia
Peru–Yugoslavia relations